CHSU-FM is a Canadian radio station, broadcasting at 99.9 FM in Kelowna, British Columbia. The station currently broadcasts a CHR/Top 40 format branded as 99.9 Virgin Radio.

History
CHSU traces its origins to 1995 when the Canadian Radio-television and Telecommunications Commission (CRTC) granted Four Seasons Radio Ltd. a new FM licence for the Kelowna market offering country music. The stations initial call letters were CKBL and its branding was 99.9 The Bullet. It signed on in October 1995, and was the sister station of CKIQ, a news/talk station on the AM band that was owned by Four Seasons Radio Ltd. as well. In 1996, Okanagan Skeena Radio Group Ltd. acquired a number of stations in the Okanagan market when it bought out Four Seasons' parent company.

One year later, in 1997, 99.9 Sun FM replaced "The Bullet" by offering a hot adult contemporary format. Its call letters were changed to CHSU-FM as well. Simultaneously, CKIQ changed its call letters to CKBL, which meant the Kelowna market lost a news/talk station leaving cross-town competitor CKOV (since early 2010, an FM station with the call letters CKQQ) as the sole station offering that format. CKBL continued to offer country music on the rebranded 1150 AM The Bullet.

In 1999, Telemedia acquired Okanagan Skeena Radio Group Ltd. along with other radio assets across the country. In 2002, Standard Broadcasting acquired Telemedia's radio assets. Standard later sold some stations in other provinces to various companies but it has retained its British Columbia stations and CHSU continues to operate with the same format and branding.

In October 2007, Astral Media acquired Standard Broadcasting's terrestrial radio and television assets, including CHSU. Astral was in turn acquired by Bell Media.

On October 3, 2019, CHSU dropped its long-time "Sun" branding and relaunched as 99.9 Virgin Radio.

Rebroadcasters

References

External links
 99.9 Virgin Radio
 
 

Hsu
Hsu
Hsu
Virgin Radio
Radio stations established in 1997
1997 establishments in British Columbia